Jelmer Jan Steenhuis (Amsterdam, 25 March 1954) is a Dutch creator of puzzles and games. Steenhuis is best known for his weekly puzzles in the newspaper NRC Handelsblad and magazine Vrij Nederland.

Jelmer Steenhuis used to be a lawyer, an occupation he gradually started to combine with the design of puzzles. From 1987 he was responsible for the cryptic crossword in NRC Handelsblad, the so-called Scrypto, a renowned puzzle that until then was compiled by Henk Scheltes. Later on, from 1990, Steenhuis also started to compile a weekly variety puzzle in the Vrij Nederland, loosely based on similar puzzles in American periodicals.

In 1997 Steenhuis decided to concentrate exclusively on the compiling of puzzles as a profession, resulting in his own business start-up Studio Steenhuis. Studio Steenhuis provides, in addition to the mentioned-above, many other puzzles and games, including the daily newspuzzle In Het Midden (In The Middle) in nrc.next and the picture puzzle Gezocht (Wanted) in NRC Handelsblad. Also in magazines such as Safe, the sponsored magazine from the asset management firm Robeco, and Resource, the student magazine at the University of Wageningen, one can find puzzles of Studio Steenhuis. The annual Econogram, in which the economic year is cryptically discussed, is a highlight for many readers of NRC Handelsblad.

Besides puzzles on paper, Studio Steenhuis also produces online games (Bouwstenen), TV formats (including Superlink, which was broadcast by the Evangelische Omroep in 2005) and boardgames (4Getit). In addition, Studio Steenhuis and NRC Handelsblad started a subscription-based website in 2010, on which puzzles and games are offered.

External links
 Official website
 Puzzle website
 Gesprek met Jelmer Steenhuis. Grossier in puzzeldrugs, nrc.nl, 4 maart 2003

Notes

Puzzle designers
1954 births
Living people
Businesspeople from Amsterdam